Karin Fong is a Los Angeles-based Emmy-award winning director and designer. Fong is an originator of Imaginary Forces, which is a design studio and creative agency.

Early life 
Karin Fong was born in 1971 and had a childhood watching Sesame Street, which gave a significant impact as an artist. She was a kid who liked to draw and create her animations using stop-motion films. As she grew up, Fong graduated from Yale University with an art degree. During college, she made a project that led her to start her career in WGBH Public Television. Her first job at WGBH was animating for the PBS show "Where is the World Is Carmen Sandiego?"

Career

1990s 
Fong started to work with an agency called R/Greenberg Associates, which designed the titles for Superman, Alien, and Ghostbusters. In 1996, she became a founding member of a Hollywood and New York-based design studio Imaginary Forces(IF) which diverged from the West Coast division of R/Greenberg Associates. Working at Imaginary Forces, Fong met Joseph McGinty Nichol as her client.

2000s 
Joseph McGinty Nichol suggested her a job as creative officer at his American production company, Wonderland Sound and Vision in 2001 and started to work more with him.

Contributions 
Karin Fong has contributed to various title designs for film and television.

 The Island of Dr.Moreau (1996)
 Mimic (1997)
 Dead Man on Campus (1998)
 Charlie's Angels (2000)
 Daredevil (2003)
 Hellboy (2004)
 Charlotte's Web (2006)
 Terminator: Salvation (2009)
 Boardwalk Empire (2010)
 Rubicon (2010)
 Black Sails (2014)
 Counterpart (2017)

Awards and nominations

Television Academy Awards

References 

Living people
1971 births
American designers
Artists from Los Angeles
21st-century American artists